Teodor Lungu (born 12 June 1995) is a Moldovan footballer who plays as a midfielder for Sfântul Gheorghe Suruceni in the Moldovan National Division.

Club career
Lungu made his debut for Sfântul Gheorghe in the Moldovan National Division in a 2–2 draw against Sheriff Tiraspol on 29 April 2018. He played four matches in the 2018 Moldovan National Division, before transferring to Romanian Liga III side Foresta Suceava in August 2018. He left the club in November 2019. Ahead of the 2020–21 season, he returned to Moldova, joining Dacia Buiucani.

In January 2021, Lungu returned to Sfântul Gheorghe, signing a two-year contract.

International career
In March 2021, he was called up to the Moldova national team for the first time.

References

External links

1995 births
Living people
People from Ialoveni District
Moldovan footballers
Moldovan expatriate footballers
Expatriate footballers in Romania
Moldovan expatriate sportspeople in Romania
Association football midfielders
Moldovan Super Liga players
Liga III players
FC Sfîntul Gheorghe players
ACS Foresta Suceava players
Dacia Buiucani players